Lost & Found is a rock compilation album for the American film directed by Jeff Pollack, Lost & Found, released by Capitol Records on May 4, 1999. The album consists of such popular names as Zebrahead, Earth, Wind and Fire and the Kottonmouth Kings among others.

Track listing

References

1999 soundtrack albums
Comedy film soundtracks
Capitol Records soundtracks